Virginie Duby-Muller (born 16 August 1979) is a French politician of The Republicans (LR) who has been a member of the National Assembly since the 2012 elections, representing Haute-Savoie's 4th constituency. Within her party, she has been serving as deputy chairwoman since 2019, under the leadership of chairman Christian Jacob.

Political career
In 1997, at the age of 18, Duby-Muller joined the Rassemblement pour la République (RPR), which would later become the UMP.

Since joining the National Assembly in the 2012 elections, Duby-Muller has been serving on the Committee on Cultural Affairs and Education. In addition to her committee assignments, she is a member of the French-Ethiopian Parliamentary Friendship Group. From 2013 until 2017, she was also part of the French delegation to the Inter-Parliamentary Union (IPU).

In the Republicans’ 2016 presidential primaries, Duby-Muller endorsed Nicolas Sarkozy as the party's candidate for the office of President of France. When the primaries' winner François Fillon became embroiled in a political affair during his campaign, she was one of the LR members who publicly called on him to step down.

Since the 2017 elections, Duby-Muller has been serving as one of the eleven deputy chairpersons of the Republicans' parliamentary group, under the leadership of chairman Christian Jacob.

In the Republicans’ 2017 leadership election, Duby-Muller endorsed Laurent Wauquiez as chairman and later became his campaign's spokesperson.

Political positions
In July 2019, Duby-Muller voted against the French ratification of the European Union’s Comprehensive Economic and Trade Agreement (CETA) with Canada.

References

External links 
 Biography at the National Assembly

1979 births
Living people
People from Haute-Savoie
Politicians from Auvergne-Rhône-Alpes
Rally for the Republic politicians
Union for a Popular Movement politicians
The Republicans (France) politicians
Deputies of the 14th National Assembly of the French Fifth Republic
Deputies of the 15th National Assembly of the French Fifth Republic
Deputies of the 16th National Assembly of the French Fifth Republic
Women members of the National Assembly (France)
21st-century French women politicians